Josh Taylor (born 2 January 1991) is a Scottish professional boxer. He is the WBO and Ring magazine light-welterweight world champion, having held the Ring title since 2019, and the WBO title since 2021. Previously, he held the unified WBA (Super), WBC and IBF titles between 2019 and 2022. At regional level, he held the Commonwealth light-welterweight title from 2016 to 2017. As an amateur, he won a lightweight silver medal at the 2010 Commonwealth Games and light-welterweight gold at the 2014 edition.

From May 2021 to May 2022, Taylor reigned as the undisputed light-welterweight champion, unifying all four major titles in the division and being only the sixth male boxer to do so. With his win over José Ramírez in 2021, Taylor became the second Scotsman to be an undisputed champion and the first Briton to do so in the four-belt era.

Nicknamed "The Tartan Tornado" for his aggressive boxing style, Taylor's knockout-to-win percentage stands at 68%. As of May 2022, he is ranked as the world's best active light-welterweight by BoxRec and the Transnational Boxing Rankings Board (TBRB), as well as the seventh-best active boxer, pound-for-pound, by the Boxing Writers Association of America, and ninth by the Ring magazine.

Amateur career
Taylor was a junior taekwondo champion, and turned to boxing at 15. He spent a short time at Meadowbank ABC and then moved onto Lochend ABC under coach Terry McCormack of Edinburgh. Taylor won a silver medal in the 2010 Commonwealth Games in Delhi, where he was beaten by Thomas Stalker in the lightweight final by 11–3.

Following the European Qualifying Event in Trabzon, Turkey, the ACB Lochend boxer qualified for the 2012 Summer Olympics in London, losing to number two seed Domenico Valentino in the round of 16. Taylor became the first lightweight Scottish boxer to qualify for the Olympics since Dick McTaggart, who won a gold medal in Melbourne in 1956 and a bronze in Rome at the following games.

He reached a Commonwealth Games final again in 2014, this time at light-welterweight. Taylor won the gold medal, defeating Junias Jonas of Namibia in the final. Taylor also represented the British Lionhearts at the World Series of Boxing.

Professional career

Early career 

Taylor started his professional career in June 2015, signing with Barry McGuigan's Cyclone Promotions, and was trained by Shane McGuigan. Taylor made his debut in July 2015, defeating Archie Weah with a second round technical knockout (TKO).

In his seventh fight, Taylor picked up the Commonwealth light-welterweight title by beating Dave Ryan with a fifth-round stoppage. Ryan went down twice over the course of the bout. Ryan had previously held the title between 2014 and 2015. Taylor won his first seven fights by knockout (KO). His KO streak came to an end against Alfonso Olvera, who went eight rounds with Taylor at the MGM Grand Garden Arena in Las Vegas on 28 January 2017. Taylor won the fight by unanimous decision (UD) with scores of 79–72, and 78-73 twice. On 24 March Taylor defended his Commonwealth title for the first time, beating Warren Joubert with a sixth-round TKO, after hurting him several times with left hooks. Joubert went down in round six and his corner threw in the towel.

Rise up the ranks

Taylor vs Davies
On 8 July Taylor faced WBC Silver champion and fellow unbeaten prospect Ohara Davies. The two had previously taunted each other on Twitter. Taylor would also be defending the Commonwealth title. Taylor dominated the fight and stopped Davies, dropping him once in round three and twice in round seven before the referee halted the contest.

Taylor vs Vázquez
Taylor defended his WBC Silver title against former lightweight world champion Miguel Vázquez on 11 November at the Royal Highland Centre. Although Vázquez' style seemed to pose problems for Taylor in the early rounds, Taylor wore him down as the fight went on. Vázquez went down in round nine from body shots, and he failed to beat the count. This was Vázquez' first stoppage loss.

On 18 January 2018 it was confirmed that Taylor would defend his WBC Silver light-welterweight title against veteran Humberto Soto on 3 March 2018, at the SSE Hydro in Glasgow. On 24 February 2018 it was revealed that Soto had sustained an injury whilst training meaning he had to pull out the fight. On the same day, Winston Campos was announced as his replacement.

Taylor vs Postol
In June 2018, Taylor fought former WBC light-welterweight champion, Viktor Postol, gaining a UD win in a twelve-round fight, meaning that he was placed in the mandatory position to fight WBC light-welterweight champion, José Ramírez. The fight took place at the SSE Hydro, Glasgow.

World Boxing Super Series

On 30 June 2018, it was announced that Taylor would join fellow light welterweights Ryan Martin, Terry Flanagan, Regis Prograis, Eduard Troyanovsky, Anthony Yigit, Ivan Baranchyk and WBA champion, Kiryl Relikh in the eight man tournament.

Taylor vs Martin
At a gala held in Moscow, Taylor selected to fight Ryan Martin in the quarter-finals. Taylor dominated the fight with Martin throwing few punches. In the seventh round, Taylor landed a flurry of punches that staggered Martin which resulted in referee Victor Loughlin stopping the fight.

Taylor vs Baranchyk
Taylor won his first world title, the IBF light-welterweight title, by UD against Ivan Baranchyk in Glasgow on 18 May 2019. Taylor scored two knockdowns in the fight.

Unified light-welterweight champion

Taylor vs Prograis
Taylor won a unification bout against WBA (Super) light-welterweight champion Regis Prograis by majority decision (MD) in the final of the World Boxing Super Series at The O2 Arena in London on 26 October 2019. The fight was shown live on Sky Sports Box Office. Two judges scored the fight 117–112 and 115–113 in favour of Taylor while the third scored it a draw at 114–114. Taylor lifted the Muhammad Ali Trophy as the winner of the 2018-19 World Boxing Super Series – Light-welterweight division along with the vacant Ring magazine title.

Taylor vs Khongsong 
In his next fight, Taylor defended his titles against undefeated challenger Apinun Khongsong on 26 September 2020 at York Hall, London. Taylor did not waste any time, dropping and stopping Khongsong in the first round with a body shot. The time of stoppage was 2:41.

Undisputed light-welterweight champion

Taylor vs Ramírez 

Taylor faced WBC and WBO champion José Ramírez on 22 May 2021, at the Virgin Hotels Las Vegas in Paradise, Nevada, for the undisputed light-welterweight title. Taylor knocked his opponent down twice in the sixth and seventh rounds, both times with his left hand, en route to a unanimous decision victory with all three judges scoring the bout 114–112 in his favour. The result meant that Taylor became the second Scotsman to be an undisputed champion (after Ken Buchanan); the first British fighter to become an undisputed champion in the four-belt era; and only the fifth man to do so after Bernard Hopkins, Jermain Taylor, Terence Crawford and Oleksandr Usyk.

Taylor vs Catterall 

Taylor's first defence of his undisputed light-welterweight title had been scheduled for 18 December 2021, against WBO mandatory challenger Jack Catterall at SSE Hydro in Glasgow. It was announced by Taylor on 21 October that he had suffered an injury, and thus the fight was postponed to 26 February 2022.

On the night, despite being knocked down by Catterall in the eighth round and being seemingly outboxed by the challenger, Taylor was handed a very controversial split decision victory, with scores of 114–111 and 113–112 in his favour, and 113–112 in favour of Catterall. According to CompuBox, Catterall landed more punches than Taylor in 11 out of 12 rounds. The challenger landed 120 of 525 (23%) total punches, and 81 of 267 (30%) of his power punches, with Taylor throwing and landing far fewer in comparison: 73 of 306 (24%) overall, and 57 of 179 (32%) on power shots. Former world cruiserweight champion and pundit Johnny Nelson stated, "It's decisions like this which turn casual fans off. Josh Taylor did not win that fight." The decision was labelled as "the biggest robbery in British boxing history". Irish bookmaker Paddy Power stated that they would be refunding all stakes placed by their customers on Catterall to win the bout, as it "was an absolute robbery". Despite the widespread public opinion, Taylor was defiant in his post-fight interview, saying, "I don't think there is any need for a rematch... I know I won the fight."

Personal life
As a child, Taylor was passionate about motorcycle racing, and "dreamed about being a world champion superbike racer or a world champion MotoGP racer"; he named motorcycle racers Valentino Rossi and Steve Hislop as his childhood heroes. Taylor has been a supporter of Hibernian F.C. since he was a child.

In December 2019, Taylor was arrested and charged with behaving in a threatening or abusive manner due to an incident whilst partying in Edinburgh. After being asked to leave a nightclub, he said a bouncer's "nose ring is gay", and referred to the bouncer as a "gay-looking cunt" and a "big orange-looking cunt". Taylor later pleaded guilty at Edinburgh Sheriff Court and was fined £350. He said on Twitter afterwards, "I whole heartedly apologise for my stupid actions. It has been a rollercoaster of a year for me, becoming unified world champion and on this occasion I've taken it too far."

Taylor is engaged to Danielle Murphy.

Professional boxing record

Pay-per-view bouts

See also
 List of world light-welterweight boxing champions
 List of undisputed world boxing champions
 List of WBA world champions
 List of WBC world champions
 List of IBF world champions
 List of WBO world champions
 List of The Ring world champions
 List of Commonwealth Boxing Council champions
 Boxing at the 2012 Summer Olympics
 List of southpaw stance boxers

References

External links
 
 Profile on AIBA
Josh Taylor - Profile, News Archive & Current Rankings at Box.Live

1991 births
Scottish people of Irish descent
Living people
Scottish male boxers
People from Prestonpans
Alumni of Preston Lodge High School
Lightweight boxers
Boxers at the 2012 Summer Olympics
Olympic boxers of Great Britain
Boxers at the 2014 Commonwealth Games
Boxers at the 2010 Commonwealth Games
Commonwealth Games silver medallists for Scotland
Commonwealth Games gold medallists for Scotland
Commonwealth Games medallists in boxing
Commonwealth Boxing Council champions
World Boxing Association champions
International Boxing Federation champions
World Boxing Council champions
World Boxing Organization champions
The Ring (magazine) champions
Medallists at the 2010 Commonwealth Games
Medallists at the 2014 Commonwealth Games